Eric James Brotherton (born 7 May 1938, Ventersburg, Orange Free State, South Africa) is a former South African cricketer and squash player.

Brotherton made his first-class debut in 1959–60, opening the batting for Eastern Province with his captain Geoff Dakin and scoring 215 runs at an average of 23.88 with most of his innings exceeding 20 but with a top score of 33. In 1960–61, when Eastern Province had their best season in the Currie Cup, finishing second with four wins from six matches, Brotherton scored 336 runs at 30.54. He also played a match for South African Universities, hitting 164 not out, the record score for the Universities, against Western Province, putting on 227 for the fourth wicket with Colin Bland.

After a two-season gap he played for North Eastern Transvaal in 1963–64, leading the team's aggregates and averages with 308 runs at 30.80. He captained North Eastern Transvaal in 1964–65. When North Eastern Transvaal won Section B of the Currie Cup in 1965-66 he made 376 runs at 41.77, scoring 111 in the first match of the season. He played on with less success until 1969–70.

In the 1960s, Brotherton played squash for South Africa.

References

External links

1938 births
Living people
South African cricketers
South African Universities cricketers
Eastern Province cricketers
Northerns cricketers
South African male squash players
Alumni of St. Andrew's College, Grahamstown